Yaqub Kareem (born in Lagos) is a Nigerian professional super fly/bantam/super bantamweight boxer of the 2000s and 2010s who won the Commonwealth super flyweight title, his professional fighting weight varied from , i.e. super flyweight to , i.e. super bantamweight.

References

External links

Image - Yaqub Kareem

Bantamweight boxers
Sportspeople from Lagos
Super-bantamweight boxers
Super-flyweight boxers
Nigerian male boxers
Living people
Year of birth missing (living people)
21st-century Nigerian people